Tephrinectes sinensis, the Chinese brill, is a species of flatfish in the large-tooth flounder family, Paralichthyidae. It is the only member of its genus Tephrinectes. Like the rest of the large-tooth flounders, it has both eyes on the left side of its head.

It is a demersal fish that lives in sub-tropical waters. It is native to the western Pacific Ocean, from Taiwan to the coast of mainland China. It has been used in Chinese medicine.

References

Fish of China
Fish of Taiwan
Marine fauna of East Asia
Fish described in 1802
Monotypic marine fish genera
Taxa named by Albert Günther
Paralichthyidae